All of the Above is the first album by The John Hall Band released in 1981.

The album peaked at #158 on the Billboard 200. "Crazy (Keep On Falling)" narrowly missed the Top 40, peaking at #42 on the Billboard Hot 100.

Track listing
All tracks are written by John and Johanna Hall. Noted in some of the songs are co-writers with the two mentioned.

Personnel
The John Hall Band
John Hall - lead vocals, guitar
John Troy - bass, backing vocals
Eric Parker - drums, percussion
Bob Leinbach - keyboards, backing vocals

Production
Producer: John Hall,  Richard Sanford Orshoff
Engineers: Bill Bottrell, Clifford Bunnell, David Marquette, Guy Charbonneau, Mitch Gibson
Photography: Brian Hagiwara

Charts
Album

Singles

References

External links

1981 debut albums
EMI America Records albums